Jonathan Philip Mitchell (born 24 November 1994) is an English professional footballer who plays as a goalkeeper for EFL League One club Doncaster Rovers.

He was previously with Newcastle United as a youth and reserve player, and has also played for Workington, Luton Town, Oxford United, Shrewsbury Town, Macclesfield Town and Northampton Town on loan.

Early and personal life
Mitchell was born and raised in Hartlepool, and is a Hartlepool United supporter. He attended High Tunstall College of Science, where he captained the rugby team. In September 2021, Mitchell opened High Tunstall's new 3G pitch facility.

Club career
Mitchell made his debut for Newcastle United's reserve team in January 2011 while still at school. He spent time on loan at Workington during the second half of the 2012–13 season, and returned to the club for a second loan spell in August 2013.

He was released by Newcastle in June 2014, signing immediately for Derby County. He said he was looking forward to working with Derby's goalkeeping coach Eric Steele. He made his professional debut on 9 January 2016 in the FA Cup against his hometown club Hartlepool United.

On 5 March, Mitchell joined League Two club Luton Town on loan until the end of the 2015–16 season. He made his debut on the same day in a 1–0 win away to Leyton Orient.

On 21 March, Mitchell was named in the Football League Team of the Week for his performance against Plymouth Argyle two days earlier when he made a number of saves, mostly notably from Graham Carey and Gregg Wylde, keeping a clean sheet to help Luton earn a 1–0 away win. Following an injury to Lee Grant, Derby recalled Mitchell early from his loan on 5 April.

He moved on loan to Oxford United in August 2018 as cover for the injured Simon Eastwood. He kept a clean sheet on his first-team debut (a 2–0 home victory over Coventry City in the EFL Cup) and saved a penalty on his league debut, a 4–1 away defeat at Portsmouth. Mitchell finished the loan with 15 appearances, with 10 of those appearances coming in the league.

In January 2019 he moved on loan to Shrewsbury Town. He signed on loan for Macclesfield Town in January 2020.

On 4 August 2020 he signed on loan for Northampton Town for the 2020–21 season.

On 14 June 2021 it was announced that he would leave Derby at the end of the season, following the expiry of his contract.

In August 2021 he signed for Hartlepool United. Mitchell made his Hartlepool debut in an EFL Cup defeat to Crewe Alexandra. He left Hartlepool on 19 January 2022.

On 21 January 2022, Mitchell joined League One club Doncaster Rovers on an eighteen-month deal.

International career
On 29 September 2016, Mitchell was called up to the England U21 squad for the first time for their 2017 UEFA European Under-21 Championship qualification matches against Kazakhstan and Bosnia and Herzegovina.

Career statistics

References

1994 births
Living people
Footballers from Hartlepool
English footballers
England under-21 international footballers
Association football goalkeepers
Newcastle United F.C. players
Workington A.F.C. players
Derby County F.C. players
Luton Town F.C. players
Oxford United F.C. players
Shrewsbury Town F.C. players
Macclesfield Town F.C. players
Northampton Town F.C. players
Hartlepool United F.C. players
Doncaster Rovers F.C. players
National League (English football) players
English Football League players